Maryland's 7th congressional district of the United States House of Representatives encompasses almost the entire city of Baltimore and some of Balitmore County.  The district was created following the census of 1790, which gave Maryland one additional representative in the House. It was abolished in 1843, but was restored in 1950 as a west Baltimore district. It has been drawn as a majority-African American district since 1973. Democrat Kweisi Mfume is the current representative, winning a special election on April 28, 2020, to finish the term of Elijah Cummings, who died in October 2019. Mfume had previously held the seat from 1987 to 1996.

Voting

List of members representing the district

Recent elections

2000s

2010s

2020s

See also 

 Maryland's congressional districts
 List of United States congressional districts

References

Bibliography
 Archives of Maryland Historical List United States Representatives Maryland State Archives

 Congressional Biographical Directory of the United States 1774–present
 House of Representatives Election Statistics, 1920 to Present

07
1793 establishments in Maryland
Constituencies established in 1793